Paroedura (Madagascar ground geckos) is a genus of geckos, endemic to Madagascar and the Comoros. These geckos are typically terrestrial, though the young of most species can climb until they are too heavy for their feet to support.

Species
The following 24 species are recognized as being valid.

Paroedura androyensis  – Grandidier's Madagascar ground gecko 
Paroedura bastardi  – Mocquard's Madagascar ground gecko 
Paroedura fasciata 
Paroedura gracilis  – graceful Madagascar ground gecko 
Paroedura guibeae  – Guibé's ground gecko
Paroedura homalorhina  – northern Madagascar ground gecko 
Paroedura hordiesi  – Hordies's ground gecko
Paroedura ibityensis  – Ibity ground gecko
Paroedura karstophila 
Paroedura kloki 
Paroedura lohatsara 
Paroedura maingoka 
Paroedura masobe 
Paroedura neglecta 
Paroedura oviceps  – Nosy Be ground gecko 
Paroedura picta  – ocelot gecko 
Paroedura rennerae 
Paroedura sanctijohannis  – Comoro ground gecko
Paroedura spelaea 
Paroedura stellata 
Paroedura stumpffi  
Paroedura tanjaka 
Paroedura vahiny 
Paroedura vazimba 

Nota bene: A binomial authority in parentheses indicates that the species was originally described in a genus other than Paroedura.

References

External links

Further reading
Günther A (1879). "On Mammals and Reptiles from Johanna, Comoro Islands". Ann. Mag. Nat. Hist., Fifth Series 3: 215–219. ("Parœdura ", new genus, p. 217; "Parœdura sancti johannis ", new species, p. 218).

 
Endemic fauna of Madagascar
Reptiles of Africa
Lizard genera
Taxa named by Albert Günther